Squalidus banarescui is a species of cyprinid fish endemic to the Dadu River in Taiwan.

Named in honor of Petru Bănărescu (1921-2009), Institute of Biology, Bucharest, for his “great” contributions to Taiwanese cyprinid taxonomy, especially the subfamily Gobioninae, between 1960 and 1973.

References

Squalidus
Fish described in 2007